Tomasz Nagórka (born 2 October 1967, in Łódź) is a retired Polish athlete specialising in the sprint hurdles. He won the silver medal at the 1992 European Indoor Championships. In addition he represented his country at the 1991 World Championships.

His personal bests are 13.35 seconds in the 110 metres hurdles (Piła 1990) and 7.54 seconds in the 60 metres hurdles (Liévin 1992).

Competition record

1Did not start in the final

References

1967 births
Living people
Polish male hurdlers
Sportspeople from Łódź
20th-century Polish people